Solarpark Finow Tower is located in Finowfurth, northeast of Berlin, Germany and is equipped with Suntech modules.

The first phase of the project, FinowTower I (24.3 MW) was commissioned in 2010, and the second, FinowTower II (60.4 MW) in 2011.

See also 

Photovoltaic power stations
List of largest power stations in the world
List of photovoltaic power stations

References 

Finow Tower
Economy of Brandenburg